is a former Japanese football player. He played for Japan national team.

Playing career
He was educated at and played for Fukuoka University Ohori High School and Fukuoka University. When he was at the university, he was a member of the Japan team that won the 22nd Universiade football competition hosted by Daegu, South Korea.

He was chosen as one of the Designated Players for Development by J1 League and JFA in 2003 and 2004. Because of this status, he was able to register as an Oita Trinita player (2003) and a Sagan Tosu player (2004) while he was still eligible to play for his university club. He played one game for Oita and 10 games for Tosu.

After the graduation in 2005, he joined Kasima Antlers. He became a regular in the 2006 season for the club. He earned his first international cap on February 17, 2008 against in an East Asian Cup match against China. After being released by Vissel Kobe in the end of 2014 season, he signed in March 2015 with Cerezo Osaka.

Club statistics

National team statistics

Team honors
J1 League - 2007, 2008, 2009
Emperor's Cup - 2007
Japanese Super Cup - 2009

References

External links
 
 Japan National Football Team Database
 
 

1982 births
Living people
Fukuoka University alumni
Association football people from Fukuoka Prefecture
Japanese footballers
Japan international footballers
J1 League players
J2 League players
J3 League players
Oita Trinita players
Sagan Tosu players
Kashima Antlers players
Montedio Yamagata players
Vissel Kobe players
Cerezo Osaka players
Cerezo Osaka U-23 players
Wollongong Wolves FC players
Japanese expatriate footballers
Expatriate soccer players in Australia
Universiade medalists in football
Universiade gold medalists for Japan
Association football forwards